Vadim Tarasenko (born 12 May 1994) is a Russian motorcycle speedway rider, who rides on a Polish licence.

Career
His first speedway club is a Vostok Vladivostok from Russia] As 15 years old, Tarasenko started in Individual Under-19 Russian Championship final, finishing third. Tarasenko finishing 11th at under-21 championship scoring 5 points.

In January 2010, Tarasenko signed a four years contract in Polish league for Latvian Lokomotiv Daugavpils. On 15 May he was confirmed for starting in Polish league (minimum 16 years old). From that day, he can compete in the Polish league.

Three days after his 16th birthday, Tarasenko started in 2010 Individual Speedway Junior World Championship Qualifying Round Three in Gdańsk, Poland. Tarasenko and his uncle Artem Laguta won qualify to the semi-final One on 26 June in Krško, Slovenia.

After missing the 2022 season due to the FIM-sanctioned ban because of the invasion of Ukraine by Russia he obtained a Polish licence (as did his uncle Artem Laguta). He signed for GKM Grudziądz for the 2023 Polish speedway season.

Personal life
His mother is an older sister of Grigory Laguta (born 1984) and Artem Laguta (born 1990).

Results

World Championships
 Individual U-21 World Championship (Under-21 World Championship)
 2010 - qualify to the Semi-Final

Domestic competitions
 Team Polish Championship (Polish league)
 2010 - First League for Daugavpils
 Individual Under-21 Russian Championship
 2009 -  - Tolyatti - 11th placed (5th pts)
 Individual Under-19 Russian Championship
 2009 - 3rd placed

See also
 Russia national under-21 speedway team

References

1994 births
Living people
Russian speedway riders